Meridiano is a municipality in the state of São Paulo in Brazil. The population is 3,824 (2020 est.) in an area of 228.5 km². The elevation is 529 m.

References

Municipalities in São Paulo (state)